Syllepte fulviceps is a moth in the family Crambidae. It was described by George Thomas Bethune-Baker in 1909. It is found in the Democratic Republic of the Congo (Orientale).

The wingspan is about 38 mm. Both wings are uniform pale slate-grey.

References

Moths described in 1909
fulviceps
Moths of Africa
Endemic fauna of the Democratic Republic of the Congo